Tagab is one of the 29 districts of Badakhshan province in Afghanistan.  It was created in 2005 from part of Fayzabad District and has a population of approximately 31,207 residents.  The Karaste Canal is located in Tagab District.

See also
Fayzabad district

References

External links
Map at the Afghanistan Information Management Services

Districts of Badakhshan Province